Borja Garcés Moreno (born 6 August 1999) is Spanish professional footballer who plays as a forward for CD Tenerife on loan from Atlético Madrid.

Club career
Born in Melilla, Garcés joined Atlético Madrid's youth setup in 2016, from hometown club CF Rusadir. He made his unofficial debut for the first team on 22 May 2018, scoring the winner in a 3–2 victory over Nigeria A'.

Garcés renewed his contract on 4 July 2018 until 2021, being promoted to the reserves in the Segunda División B. After spending the whole pre-season with the first team, he made his senior debut with the B's on 9 September, playing the last 27 minutes in a 1–1 away draw against Unionistas de Salamanca CF.

On 14 September 2018, Garcés was named into Diego Simeone's squad ahead of a home fixture against SD Eibar, replacing injured Nikola Kalinić. He played his first La Liga match the following day; after coming on as a second-half substitute for Rodri, he scored a last-minute equaliser to give the hosts a 1–1 home draw.

In March 2019, Garcés suffered a serious knee injury which kept him out for six months. On 15 January 2021, he was loaned to Segunda División side CF Fuenlabrada for the remainder of the season. He scored his first goal as a professional in a 2–2 home draw with Real Oviedo on 22 February, adding a brace in the last matchday to help defeat Albacete Balompié 2–1 away.

On 12 August 2021, Garcés moved to CD Leganés of the same league on a one-year loan. In October, after he chose to attend the wedding of his brother even though he did not have the club's express permission, manager Asier Garitano said that the player would not appear in any further games for the team as long as he was in charge.

On 20 July 2022, Garcés joined fellow second-tier CD Tenerife on loan.

Career statistics

Club

References

External links

1999 births
Living people
Spanish footballers
Footballers from Melilla
Association football forwards
La Liga players
Segunda División players
Segunda División B players
Atlético Madrid B players
Atlético Madrid footballers
CF Fuenlabrada footballers
CD Leganés players
CD Tenerife players